The Kansas City Royals' season of 2010 was the 42nd for the Royals franchise.  It was also the 25th anniversary of their first World Series championship (1985).

The Royals' payroll as the 2010 season opened was $70 million (21st in the major leagues). Royals batters struck out 905 times during the season, the fewest of any team in a season in the 2010s.

Regular season
Manager Trey Hillman was dismissed after the game on May 13, 2010 and replaced with Ned Yost.

Season standings

Record vs. opponents

Game log

|- bgcolor="ffbbbb"
| 1 || April 5 || Tigers || 8–4 || Zumaya (1–0) || Tejeda (0–1) ||  || 40,052 || 0–1
|- bgcolor="bbffbb"
| 2 || April 7 || Tigers || 3–2 (11) || Farnsworth (1–0) || Valverde (0–1) ||  || 10,574 || 1–1
|- bgcolor="ffbbbb"
| 3 || April 8 || Tigers || 7–3 || Bonine (1–0) || Mendoza (0–1) ||  || 10,909 || 1–2
|- bgcolor="bbffbb"
| 4 || April 9 || Red Sox || 4–3 ||  Parrish (1–0) || Bard (0–1) ||  Soria (1) || 21,091 || 2–2
|- bgcolor="ffbbbb"
| 5 || April 10 || Red Sox || 8–3 || Beckett (1–0) || Greinke (0–1) ||  || 37,505 || 2–3
|- bgcolor="ffbbbb"
| 6 || April 11 || Red Sox || 8–6 || Buchholz (1–0) || Meche (0–1) || Papelbon (2) || 19,240 || 2–4
|- bgcolor="bbffbb"
| 7 || April 12 || @ Tigers || 10–5 || Hochevar (1–0) || Scherzer (0–1) ||  || 17,058 || 3–4
|- bgcolor="ffbbbb"
| 8 || April 13 || @ Tigers || 6–5 || Zumaya (2–0)  || Hughes (0–1) || Valverde (2) || 18,414|| 3–5
|- bgcolor="bbffbb"
| 9 || April 14 || @ Tigers || 7–3 || Davies (1–0) || Perry (0–1) || Soria (2) || 19,262 || 4–5
|- bgcolor=#ffbbbb
| 10 ||	April 16 || @ Twins || 10–3 || Baker (2–1) || Greinke (0–2) || || 38,532 || 4–6
|- bgcolor=#ffbbbb
| 11 ||	April 17 || @ Twins || 6–5 || Duensing (2–0) || Parrish (1–1) || Rauch (6) || 38,564 || 4–7
|- bgcolor=#bbffbb
| 12 || April 18 || @ Twins || 10–5 || Hochevar (2-0) || Pavano (2–1) || Soria (3) || 38,544 || 5–7
|- bgcolor=#ffbbbb
| 13 || April 19 || @ Blue Jays || 8–1 || Morrow (1–1) || Bannister (0–1) || || 10,314 || 5–8
|- bgcolor=#ffbbbb
| 14 || April 20 || @ Blue Jays || 4–3 || Camp (1–0) || Davies (0–2) || Gregg (4) || 10,565 || 5–9
|- bgcolor=#bbffbb
| 15 || April 21 || @ Blue Jays || 4–3 (10) || Tejeda (1–1) || Downs (0–1)  || Soria (4) || 15,577 || 6–9
|- bgcolor=#ffbbbb
| 16 || April 23 || Twins || 8–3 || Pavano (3–1) || Meche (0–2) || || 16,605 || 6–10
|- bgcolor=#ffbbbb
| 17 || April 24 || Twins || 9–7 (12) || Rauch (1–0) || Tejeda (1–2) || || 26,649 || 6–11
|- bgcolor=#bbffbb
| 18 || April 25 || Twins || 4–3 || Bannister (1–1) || Slowey (2–2) || Soria (5) || 15,601 || 7–11
|- bgcolor="bbffbb"
| 19 || April 26 || Mariners || 3–1 || Davies (2–1) || Hernández (2–1) || Chen (1) || 11,391 || 8–11
|- bgcolor="#ffbbbb"
| 20 || April 27 || Mariners || 3–2 || Kelley (1-0) || Rupe (0-1) || Aardsma (7) || 14,969 || 8–12
|- bgcolor="#ffbbbb"
| 21 || April 28 || Mariners || 6–5 || League (3–1) || Thompson (0–1) || Aardsma (8) || 13,206 || 8–13
|- bgcolor="ffbbbb"
| 22 || April 29 || @ Rays || 11–1 || Garza (4–1) || Hochevar (2–1) ||  || 12,766 || 8–14
|- bgcolor="bbffbb"
| 23 || April 30 || @ Rays || 3–2 || Rupe (1–1) || Choate (0–2) || Soria (6) || 25,195 || 9–14
|-

|- bgcolor="bbffbb"
| 24 || May 1 || @ Rays || 4–2 (11) || Tejada (2–2) || Cormier (2–1) || Soria (7) || 34,813 || 10–14
|- bgcolor="ffbbbb"
| 25 || May 2 || @ Rays || 1–0 || Davis (3–1) || Greinke (0–3) || Soriano (6) || 19,757 || 10–15
|- bgcolor="ffbbbb"
| 26 || May 3 || @ White Sox || 5–1 || Peavy (1–2) || Meche (0–3) || || 21,208 || 10–16
|- bgcolor="bbffbb"
| 27 || May 4 || @ White Sox || 7–2 || Hochevar (3–1) || Floyd (1–3) || || 17,157 || 11–16
|- bgcolor="ffbbbb"
| 28 || May 5 || @ White Sox || 9–2 || García (1–2) || Bannister (1–2) || || 21,255 || 11–17
|- bgcolor="ffbbbb"
| 29 || May 6 || @ Rangers || 13–12 || Francisco (4–3) || Soria (0–1) || Feliz (7) || 15,132 || 11–18
|- bgcolor="ffbbbb"
| 30 || May 7 || @ Rangers || 4–1 || Wilson (3–1) || Greinke (0–4) || || 29,065 || 11–19
|- bgcolor="ffbbbb"
| 31 || May 8 || @ Rangers || 3–2 || Ray (1–0) || Meche (0–4) || Feliz (8) || 36,349 || 11–20
|- bgcolor="ffbbbb"
| 32 || May 9 || @ Rangers || 6–4 || Mathis (1–0) || Thompson (0–2) || Feliz (9) || 25,476 || 11–21
|- bgcolor="ffbbbb"
| 33 || May 11 || Indians || 8–2 || Westbrook (1–2) || Bannister (1–2) || || 15,930 || 11–22
|- bgcolor="ffbbbb"
| 34 || May 12 || Indians || 4–0 || Carmona (4–1) || Davies (2–2) || || 11,803 || 11–23
|- bgcolor="bbffbb"
| 35 || May 13 || Indians || 6–4 || Greinke (1-4) || Huff (1–5) || Soria (8) || 28,361 || 12–23
|- bgcolor="bbffbb"
| 36 || May 14 || White Sox || 6–1 || Hughes (1–1) || Buehrle (2–5) || || 27,816 || 13–23
|- bgcolor="ffbbbb"
| 37 || May 15 || White Sox || 5–4 || Peavy (3–2) || Hochevar (3–2) || Thornton (1) || 22,192 || 13–24
|- bgcolor="bbffbb"
| 38 || May 16 || White Sox || 5–3 || Bannister (2–3) || Floyd (1–4) || Soria (9) || 13,922 || 14–24
|- bgcolor="bbffbb"
| 39 || May 17 || @ Orioles || 4–3 || Davies (3–2) || Bergesen (3–3) || Soria (10) || 9,299 || 15–24
|- bgcolor="ffbbbb"
| 40 || May 18 || @ Orioles || 4–3 (10) || Simón (1–1) || Bullington (0–1) || || 9,715 || 15–25
|- bgcolor="bbffbb"
| 41 || May 19 || @ Indians || 8–4 || Chen (1–0) || Wood (0–2) || || 10,916 || 16–25
|- bgcolor="bbffbb"
| 42 || May 20 || @ Indians || 9–3 || Hochevar (4–2) || Talbot (5–3) || || 13,953 || 17–25
|- bgcolor="bbffbb"
| 43 || May 21 || Rockies || 9-2 || Bannister (3-3) || Hammel (1-3) ||  || 24,807 || 18-25
|- bgcolor="ffbbbb"
| 44 || May 22 || Rockies || 3-0 || Francis (1-0) || Davies (3-3) || Corpas (3) || 20,907 || 18-26
|- bgcolor="ffbbbb"
| 45 || May 23 || Rockies || 11-7 || Rogers (1-2) || Greinke (1-5) ||  || 21,867 || 18-27
|- bgcolor="ffbbbb"
| 46 || May 25 || Rangers || 8-7 || O'Day (2-2) || Thompson (0-3) || Feliz (13) || 12,796 || 18-28
|- bgcolor="bbffbb"
| 47 || May 26 || Rangers || 5-2 || Hochevar (5-2) || Feldman (2-5)  || Soria (11) || 14,722 || 19-28
|- bgcolor="bbffbb"
| 48 || May 27 || @ Red Sox || 4-3 || Bannister (4-3) || Matsuzaka (3-2) || Soria (12) || 37,940 || 20-28
|- bgcolor="bbffbb"
| 49 || May 28 || @ Red Sox || 12-5 || Davies (4-3) || Wakefield (1-3) || || 37,945 || 21-28
|- bgcolor="ffbbbb"
| 50 || May 29 || @ Red Sox || 1-0 || Buchholz (7-3) || Greinke (1-6) || Papelbon (12) || 37,956 || 21-29
|- bgcolor="ffbbbb"
| 51 || May 30 || @ Red Sox || 8-1 || Lester (6-2)  || Thompson (0-4) || || 37,581 || 21-30
|- bgcolor="ffbbbb"
| 52 || May 31 || Angels || 7-1 || Santana (5-3) || Hochevar (5-3) ||  || 24,649 || 21-31
|-

|- bgcolor="bbffbb"
| 53 || June 1 || Angels || 6-3 || Bannister (5-3) || Piñeiro (3-6) || Soria (13) || 15,142 || 22-31
|- bgcolor="ffbbbb"
| 54 || June 2 || Angels || 7-2 || Kazmir (4-5) || Davies (4-4) || || 12,718 || 22-32
|- bgcolor="ffbbbb"
| 55 || June 3 || Angels  || 5-4 || Weaver (5-2) || Greinke (1-7) || Fuentes (7) || 13,621 || 22-33
|- bgcolor="bbffbb"
| 56 || June 4 || Tigers || 7-3 || Chen (2-0) || Scherzer (2-5) || || 21,930 || 23-33
|- bgcolor="ffbbbb"
| 57 || June 5 || Tigers || 4-2 || Verlander (6-4) || Hochevar (5-4) || Valverde (12) || 24,383 || 23-34
|- bgcolor="bbffbb"
| 58 || June 6 || Tigers || 7-2 || Bannister (6-3) || Bonderman (2-4) || || 22,240 || 24-34
|- bgcolor="ffbbbb"
| 59 || June 8 || @ Twins || 7-3 || Slowey (7-3) || Greinke (1-8) || Guerrier (1) || 38,970 || 24-35
|- bgcolor="ffbbbb"
| 60 || June 9 || @ Twins || 6-2 || Pavano (6-6) || Davies (4-5) || || 40,323 || 24-36
|- bgcolor="bbffbb"
| 61 || June 10 || @ Twins || 9-8 || Chen (3-0) || Baker (5-5) || Soria (14) || 39,022 || 25-36
|- bgcolor="bbffbb"
| 62 || June 11 || @ Reds || 6-5 (11) || Marté (1-0) || Owings (3-2) || Soria (15) || 25,847 || 26-36
|- bgcolor="ffbbbb"
| 63 || June 12 || @ Reds || 11-5 || Cueto (6-1) || Bannister (6-4) || || 34,240 || 26-37 
|- bgcolor="bbffbb"
| 64 || June 13 || @ Reds || 7-3 || Greinke (2-8) || LeCure (1-3) || || 23,747 || 27-37 
|- bgcolor="bbffbb"
| 65 || June 15 || Astros || 15-7 || Texeira (1-1) || Paulino (1-8) || || 24,862 || 28-37
|- bgcolor="ffbbbb"
| 66 || June 16 || Astros || 4-2 || Oswalt (5-8) || Chen (3-1) || Lindstrom (15) || 17,675 || 28-38
|- bgcolor="bbffbb"
| 67 || June 17 || Astros || 5-2 || Marté (2-0) || Myers (4-5) || Soria (16) || 16,255 || 29-38
|- bgcolor="ffbbbb"
| 68 || June 18 || @ Braves || 6-4 || Lowe (9-5) || Bannister (6-5) || Wagner (13) || 29,808 || 29-39
|- bgcolor="ffbbbb"
| 69 || June 19 || @ Braves || 5-4 || Wagner (5-0) || Tejeda (2-3) || || 39,109 || 29-40
|- bgcolor="ffbbbb"
| 70 || June 20 || @ Braves || 8-5 || Kimbrel (2-0) || Wood (0-1) || Wagner (14) || 30,072 || 29-41
|- bgcolor="ffbbbb"
| 71 || June 21 || @ Nationals || 2-1 || Hernández (6-4) || Chen (3-2) || Capps (21) || 13,592 || 29-42
|- bgcolor="ffbbbb"
| 72 || June 22 || @ Nationals || 4-3 || Atilano (6-4) || Lerew (0-1) || Capps (22) || 21,168 || 29-43
|- bgcolor="bbffbb"
| 73 || June 23 || @ Nationals || 1-0 || Bannister (7-5) || Strasburg (2-1) || Soria (17) || 31,913 || 30-43
|- bgcolor="bbffbb"
| 74 || June 25 || Cardinals || 4-2 || Greinke (3-8) || Suppan (0-3) || Soria (18) || 38,916 || 31-43
|- bgcolor="ffbbbb"
| 75 || June 26 || Cardinals || 5-3 || Hawksworth (2-4) || Davies (4-6) || Franklin (15) || 38,457 || 31-44
|- bgcolor="bbffbb"
| 76 || June 27 || Cardinals || 10-3 || Chen (4-2) || García (7-4) || || 32,938 || 32-44
|- bgcolor="bbffbb"
| 77 || June 28 || White Sox || 3-1 || Lerew (1-1) || Buehrle (6-7) || Soria (19) || 15,056 || 33-44
|- bgcolor="ffbbbb"
| 78 || June 29 || White Sox || 4-3 || Floyd (3-7) || Bannister (7-6) || Putz (2) || 19,364 || 33-45
|- bgcolor="bbffbb"
| 79 || June 30 || White Sox || 7-6 || Greinke (4-8) || Peavy (7-6) || Soria (20) || 18,335 || 34-45
|-

|- bgcolor="bbffbb"
| 80 || July 2 || @ Angels || 2-1 (10) || Tejeda (3-3) || Shields (0-3) || Soria (21) || 40,005 || 35-45
|- bgcolor="bbffbb"
| 81 || July 3 || @ Angels || 4-2 || Chen (5-2) || Santana (8-6) || Soria (22) || 39,112 || 36-45
|- bgcolor="ffbbbb"
| 82 || July 4 || @ Angels || 11-0 || Piñeiro (9-6) || Lerew (1-2) || || 42,116 || 36-46
|- bgcolor="bbffbb"
| 83 || July 5 || @ Mariners || 6-4 (10) || Farnsworth (2-0) || Cordero (0-1) || Soria (23) || 22,617 || 37-46
|- bgcolor="bbffbb"
| 84 || July 6 || @ Mariners || 3-2 || Greinke (5-8) || Rowland-Smith (1-8) || Soria (24) || 17,555 || 38-46
|- bgcolor="bbffbb"
| 85 || July 7 || @ Mariners || 7-3 || Marté (3-0) || League (5-6) || Soria (25) || 16,954 || 39-46
|- bgcolor="ffbbbb"
| 86 || July 9 || @ White Sox || 8-2 || Buehrle (8-7) || Chen (5-3) || || 25,572 || 39-47
|- bgcolor="ffbbbb"
| 87 || July 10 || @ White Sox || 5-1 || Floyd (5-7) || Bannister (7-7) || || 32,339 || 39-48
|- bgcolor="ffbbbb"
| 88 || July 11 || @ White Sox || 15-5 || Peña (3-1) || Lerew (1-3) || || 29,040 || 39-49
|- bgcolor="bbbbbb"
| colspan="9"  | All-Star Break: National League defeats American League 3–1.
|- bgcolor="ffbbbb"
| 89 || July 16 || Athletics || 5-1 || Gonzalez (8-6) || Greinke (5-9) || || 37,312 || 39-50
|- bgcolor="ffbbbb"
| 90 || July 17 || Athletics || 6-5 || Breslow (4-2) || Soria (0-2) || Bailey (19) || 26,634 || 39-51
|- bgcolor="ffbbbb"
| 91 || July 18 || Athletics || 9-6 || Mazzaro (5-2) || Bannister (7-8) || Bailey (20) || 18,702 || 39-52
|- bgcolor="bbffbb"
| 92 || July 19 || Blue Jays || 5-4 (10) || Farnsworth (3-0) || Gregg (0-4) || || 12,968 || 40-52
|- bgcolor="ffbbbb"
| 93 || July 20 || Blue Jays || 13-1 || Litsch (1-4) || Lerew (1-4) || || 18,865 || 40-53
|- bgcolor="bbffbb"
| 94 || July 21 || Blue Jays || 5-2 || Greinke (6-9) || Rzepczynski (0-1) || Soria (26) || 15,285 || 41-53
|- bgcolor="ffbbbb"
| 95 || July 22 || @ Yankees || 10-4 || Sabathia (13-3) || Chen (5-4) || || 47,484 || 41-54
|- bgcolor="ffbbbb"
| 96 || July 23 || @ Yankees || 7-1 || Burnett (8-8) || Bannister (7-9) || || 46,801 || 41-55
|- bgcolor="bbffbb"
| 97 || July 24 || @ Yankees || 7-4 || Davies (5-6) || Mitre (0-2) || Soria (27) || 48,138 || 42-55
|- bgcolor="ffbbbb"
| 98 || July 25 || @ Yankees || 12-6 || Hughes (12-3) || O'Sullivan (1-1) || || 47,890 || 42-56
|- bgcolor="ffbbbb"
| 99 || July 26 || Twins || 19-1 || Liriano (9-7) || Greinke (6-10) || || 19,306 || 42-57
|- bgcolor="ffbbbb"
| 100 || July 27 || Twins || 11-2 || Pavano (13-6) || Chen (5-5) || || 16,749 || 42-58
|- bgcolor="ffbbbb"
| 101 || July 28 || Twins || 6-4 || Duensing (4-1) || Bannister (7-10) || Rauch (21) || 15,484 || 42-59
|- bgcolor="ffbbbb"
| 102 || July 29 || Orioles || 6-5 (11) || Hernandez (5-7) || Wood (0-2) ||  Simón (15) || 17,220 || 42-60
|- bgcolor="bbffbb"
| 103 || July 30 || Orioles || 7-5 || Wood (1-2) || Simón (2-2) || || 21,537 || 43-60
|- bgcolor="bbffbb"
| 104 || July 31 || Orioles || 4-3 || Greinke (7-10) || Hernandez (5-8) || Soria (28) || 25,055 || 44-60
|-

|- bgcolor="bbffbb"
| 105 || August 1 || Orioles || 5-4 || Chen (6-5) || Millwood (2-11) || Soria (29) || 14,662 || 45-60
|- bgcolor="ffbbbb"
| 106 || August 2 || @ Athletics || 6-0 || Cahill (11-4) || Bannister (7-11) || || 10,047 || 45-61
|- bgcolor="bbffbb"
| 107 || August 3 || @ Athletics || 3-2 || Chavez (4-2) || Breslow (4-3) || Soria (30) || 10,670 || 46-61
|- bgcolor="ffbbbb"
| 108 || August 4 || @ Athletics || 4-3 || Anderson (3-2) || O'Sullivan (1-2) || Wuertz (4) || 22,325 || 46-62
|- bgcolor="ffbbbb"
| 109 || August 6 || @ Mariners || 7-1 || French (1-2) || Greinke (7-11) || || 20,411 || 46-63
|- bgcolor="bbffbb"
| 110 || August 7 || @ Mariners || 2-1 || Chen (7-5) || Pauley (0-4) || Soria (31) || 24,520 || 47-63
|- bgcolor="ffbbbb"
| 111 || August 8 || @ Mariners || 3-2 || Vargas (8-5) || Davies (5-7) || Aardsma (20) || 24,078 || 47-64
|- bgcolor="ffbbbb"
| 112 || August 9 || @ Angels || 6-4 || Santana (11-8) || O'Sullivan (1-3) || Fuentes (22) || 40,011 || 47-65
|- bgcolor="ffbbbb"
| 113 || August 10 || @ Angels || 3-1 || Haren (1-2) || Bullington (0-2) || Fuentes (23) || 43,512 || 47-66
|- bgcolor="ffbbbb"
| 114 || August 11 || @ Angels || 2-1 (10) || Fuentes (4-1) || Chavez (4-3) || || 39,093 || 47-67
|- bgcolor="ffbbbb"
| 115 || August 12 || Yankees || 4-3 || Sabathia (15-5) || Chen (7-6) || Robertson (1) || 23,337 || 47-68
|- bgcolor="bbffbb"
| 116 || August 13 || Yankees || 4-3 || Davies (6-7) || Moseley (2-2) || Soria (32) || 30,680 || 48-68
|- bgcolor="ffbbbb"
| 117 || August 14 || Yankees || 8-3 || Hughes (14-5) || O'Sullivan (1-4) || || 34,206 || 48-69
|- bgcolor="bbffbb"
| 118 || August 15 || Yankees || 1-0 || Bullington (1-2) || Burnett (9-10) || Soria (33) || 26,012 || 49-69
|- bgcolor="bbffbb"
| 119 || August 17 || Indians || 2-1 || Greinke (8-11) || Gómez (3-1) || Soria (34) || 13,258 || 50-69
|- bgcolor="bbffbb"
| 120 || August 18 || Indians || 9-7 || Chen (8-6) || Carmona (11-11) || Soria (35) || 12,864 || 51-69
|- bgcolor="ffbbbb"
| 121 || August 19 || Indians || 7-3 || Pérez (4-0) || Wood (1-3) || Perez (15) || 9,732 || 51-70
|- bgcolor="bbbbbb"
|  || August 20 || White Sox || colspan=6 |Postponed (rain); rescheduled for August 21
|- bgcolor="bbffbb"
| 122 || August 21 (Game 1) || White Sox || 6-5 (11) || Chavez (5-3) || Sale (0-1) || || N/A || 52-70
|- bgcolor="ffbbbb"
| 123 || August 21 (Game 2) || White Sox || 7-6 (10) || Putz (6-5) || Holland (0-1) || || 25,543 || 52-71
|- bgcolor="bbffbb"
| 124 || August 22 || White Sox || 3-2 (10) || O'Sullivan (2-4) || Linebrink (1-1) || || 18,877 || 53-71
|- bgcolor="ffbbbb"
| 125 || August 23 || @ Tigers || 12-3 || Bonderman (7-9) || Chen (8-7) || || 30,552 || 53-72
|- bgcolor="ffbbbb"
| 126 || August 24 || @ Tigers || 9-1 || Porcello (6-11) || Davies (6-8) || || 29,043 || 53-73
|- bgcolor="bbffbb"
| 127 || August 25 || @ Tigers || 4-3 (12) || Humber (1-0) || Fígaro (0-1) || Soria (36) || 31,231 || 54-73
|- bgcolor="ffbbbb"
| 128 || August 27 || @ Indians || 15-4 || Tomlin (2-3) || Bullington (1-3) || || 17,631 || 54-74
|- bgcolor="ffbbbb"
| 129 || August 28 || @ Indians || 4-3 (10) || Perez (2-2) || Chavez (5-4) || || 16,372 || 54-75
|- bgcolor="bbffbb"
| 130 || August 29 || @ Indians || 6-2 || Chen (9-7) || Carmona (11-13) || || 19,725 || 55-75
|- bgcolor="ffbbbb"
| 131 || August 30 || Rangers || 3-0 || Wilson (14-5) || Davies (6-9) || Feliz (33) || 15,881 || 55-76
|- bgcolor="bbffbb"
| 132 || August 31 || Rangers || 10-9 || Soria (1-2) || Oliver (1-2) || || 10,295 || 56-76
|-

|- bgcolor="ffbbbb"
| 133 || September 1 || Rangers || 4-3 || Hunter (12-2) || Bullington (1-4) || Feliz (34) || 10,811 || 56-77
|- bgcolor="ffbbbb"
| 134 || September 3 || Tigers || 9-5 (11) || Perry (3-5) || Chavez (5-5) || || 17,835 || 56-78
|- bgcolor="ffbbbb"
| 135 || September 4 || Tigers || 6-4 || Porcello (8-11) || Hughes (1-2) || Valverde (25) || 21,483 || 56-79
|- bgcolor="bbffbb"
| 136 || September 5 || Tigers || 2-1 || Davies (7-9) || Thomas (5-2) || Soria (37) || 19,061 || 57-79
|- bgcolor="ffbbbb"
| 137 || September 6 || @ Twins || 5-4 || Manship (2-0) || O'Sullivan (2-5) || Capps (10) || 40,228 || 57-80
|- bgcolor="ffbbbb"
| 138 || September 7 || @ Twins || 10-3 || Liriano (13-7) || Bannister (7-12) || || 38,816 || 57-81
|- bgcolor="ffbbbb"
| 139 || September 8 || @ Twins || 4-3 || Duensing (8-2) || Greinke (8-12) || Capps (11) || 39,376 || 57-82
|- bgcolor="ffbbbb"
| 140 || September 10 || @ White Sox || 4-3 || Putz (7-5) || Tejeda (3-4) || Sale (2) || 27,009 || 57-83
|- bgcolor="bbffbb"
| 141 || September 11 || @ White Sox || 8-2 || Davies (8-9) || Jackson (3-1) || || 26,389 || 58-83
|- bgcolor="ffbbbb"
| 142 || September 12 || @ White Sox || 12-6 || Santos (2-0) || Humber (1-1) || || 23,756 || 58-84
|- bgcolor="ffbbbb"
| 143 || September 13 || Athletics || 3-1 || Cramer (1-0) || Hochevar (5-5) || Bailey (24) || 20,695 || 58-85
|- bgcolor="bbffbb"
| 144 || September 14 || Athletics || 11-3 || Greinke (9-12) || Gonzalez (14-9) || || 12,852 || 59-85
|- bgcolor="bbffbb"
| 145 || September 15 || Athletics || 6-3 || Chen (10-7) || Cahill (16-7) || Soria (38) || 11,087 || 60-85
|- bgcolor="ffbbbb"
| 146 || September 17 || Indians || 11-4 || Carrasco (1-0) || Davies (8-10) || || 21,168 || 60-86
|- bgcolor="ffbbbb"
| 147 || September 18 || Indians || 6-4 || Smith (2-2) || O'Sullivan (2-6) || Perez (21) || 18,112 || 60-87
|- bgcolor="bbffbb"
| 148 || September 19 || Indians || 6-4 || Hochevar (6-5) || Tomlin (4-4) || Soria (39) || 17,803 || 61-87
|- bgcolor="ffbbbb"
| 149 || September 20 || @ Tigers || 7-5 || Thomas (6-2) || Greinke (9-13) || Coke (2) || 24,382 || 61-88
|- bgcolor="bbffbb"
| 150 || September 21 || @ Tigers || 9-6 || Chen (11-7) || Galarraga (4-7) || Soria (40) || 26,178 || 62-88
|- bgcolor="ffbbbb"
| 151 || September 22 || @ Tigers || 4-2 || Scherzer (12-10) || Davies (8-11) || || 24,678 || 62-89
|- bgcolor="bbffbb"
| 152 || September 23 || @ Indians || 4-2 || O'Sullivan (3-6) || Talbot (9-13) || Soria (41) || 16,625 || 63-89
|- bgcolor="ffbbbb"
| 153 || September 24 || @ Indians || 7-3 || Tomlin (5-4) || Hochevar (6-6) || || 25,100 || 63-90
|- bgcolor="ffbbbb"
| 154 || September 25 || @ Indians || 7-1 || Gómez (4-5) || Greinke (9-14) || || 19,746 || 63-91
|- bgcolor="ffbbbb"
| 155 || September 26 || @ Indians || 5-3 || Pérez (6-1) || Tejeda (3-5) || Pestano (1) || 18,813 || 63-92
|- bgcolor="bbffbb"
| 156 || September 27 || Twins || 10-8 || Humber (2-1) || Manship (2-1) || Soria (42) || 19,307 || 64-92
|- bgcolor="bbffbb"
| 157 || September 28 || Twins || 10-1 || O'Sullivan (4-6) || Blackburn (10-11) || || 18,487 || 65-92
|- bgcolor="ffbbbb"
| 158 || September 29 || Twins || 4-2 || Guerrier (5-7) || Meche (0-5) || Capps (16) || 18,340 || 65-93
|- bgcolor="bbffbb"
| 159 || September 30 || Rays || 3-2 || Greinke (10-14) || Garza (15-10) || Soria (43) || 21,563 || 66-93
|- bgcolor="bbffbb"
| 160 || October 1 || Rays || 7-0 || Chen (12-7) || Shields (13-15) || || 23,374 || 67-93
|- bgcolor="ffbbbb"
| 161 || October 2 || Rays || 4-0 || Qualls (3-4) || Davies (8-12) || || 32,484 || 67-94
|- bgcolor="ffbbbb"
| 162 || October 3 || Rays || 3-2 (12)|| Niemann (12-8) || Hughes (1-3) || Soriano (45) || 20,936 || 67-95
|- bgcolor="

Roster

Player stats

Batting
Note: G = Games played; AB = At bats; R = Runs scored; H = Hits; 2B = Doubles; 3B = Triples; HR = Home runs; RBI = Runs batted in; AVG = Batting average; SB = Stolen bases

Pitching
Note: W = Wins; L = Losses; ERA = Earned run average; G = Games pitched; GS = Games started; SV = Saves; IP = Innings pitched; R = Runs allowed; ER = Earned runs allowed; BB = Walks allowed; SO = Strikeouts

Farm system 

LEAGUE CHAMPIONS: Northwest Arkansas

References
Kansas City Royals: Official web site

External links

2010 Kansas City Royals Official Site
2010 Kansas City Royals at Baseball Reference

Kansas City Royals
Kansas City Royals seasons
2010 in sports in Missouri